The Yale Bulldogs are the intercollegiate athletic teams that represent Yale University, located in New Haven, Connecticut. The school sponsors 35 varsity sports.  The school has won two  NCAA national championships in women's fencing, four in men's swimming and diving, 21 in men's golf, one in men's hockey, one in men's lacrosse, and 16 in sailing.

Championships

NCAA team championships

Yale has 29 NCAA team national championships.

Men's (27)
Golf † (21): 1897, 1898, 1902, 1905, 1906, 1907, 1908, 1909, 1910, 1911, 1912, 1913, 1915, 1924, 1925, 1926, 1931, 1932, 1933, 1936, 1943
Ice Hockey (1): 2013
Lacrosse (1): 2018
Swimming (4): 1942, 1944, 1951, 1953
Women's (2)
Fencing (2): 1984, 1985

Notable alumni

Sada Jacobson (born 1983), Olympic fencing saber silver and bronze medalist, and 2-time NCAA champion.

† The NCAA started sponsoring the intercollegiate golf championship in 1939, but it retained the titles from the 41 championships previously conferred by the National Intercollegiate Golf Association in its records. 
see also:
Ivy League NCAA team championships
List of NCAA schools with the most NCAA Division I championships

Men's sports

Baseball

Major leaguers pitcher Craig Breslow (Oakland A's and Boston Red Sox) and catcher Ryan Lavarnway (Boston Red Sox/Los Angeles Dodgers), among others, played baseball for the Bulldogs. Perhaps Yale's most notable baseball player, however, was future U.S. president George H. W. Bush, who played for the Bulldogs in the late 1940s.

Breslow led the Ivy League with a 2.56 ERA in 2002.  Lavarnway led the NCAA in batting average (.467) and slugging percentage (.873) in 2007, set the Ivy League hitting-streak record (25), and through 2010 held the Ivy League record in career home runs (33).  In August 2012, Breslow and Lavarnway, playing for the Red Sox, became the first Yale grads to be Major League teammates since 1949.

Men's basketball

The men's basketball team has been named national champion on six occasions – in 1896, 1897, 1899, and 1900 by the Premo-Porretta Power Poll, which began retroactive selections with the 1895–96 season; and in 1901 and 1903 by the Helms Athletic Foundation, which began retroactive selections with the 1900–01 season.
Penn and Yale played in the First College Basketball game with 5 men on a team in 1897.

Yale has won seven Ivy League championships – 1957, 1962, 1963, 2002, 2016, 2019 and 2020. It also won the Eastern Intercollegiate Basketball League, the forerunner to the Ivy League, eight times – 1902, 1903, 1907, 1915, 1917, 1923, 1933 and 1949.

Men's crew

Football

The football team has competed since 1876.  They have won nineteen national championships when the school competed in what is now known as the FBS.  They are perhaps best known for their rivalry with Harvard, known as "The Game".  Twenty one former players have been inducted into the College Football Hall of Fame.

Men's golf

The  Yale Men's Golf Team has won 21 collegiate team championships (all except 1943 were bestowed by the National Intercollegiate Golf Association): 1897, 1898 (spring), 1902 (spring), 1905–13, 1915, 1924–26, 1931–33, 1936, 1943. They have crowned 13 individual champions: John Reid, Jr. (1898, spring), Charles Hitchcock, Jr. (1902, fall), Robert Abbott (1905), W. E. Clow, Jr. (1906), Ellis Knowles (1907), Robert Hunter (1910), George Stanley (1911), Nathaniel Wheeler (1913), Francis Blossom (1915), Jess Sweetser (1920), Dexter Cummings (1923, 1924), Tom Aycock (1929). Both are records. They have won 10 Ivy League championships since the League championship was started in 1975: 1984–85, 1988, 1990–91, 1996–97, 2003, 2011, 2018. Both the Men's and Women's Golf Teams play out of the Yale Golf Course which has been ranked the best collegiate golf course in the country by Golfweek.com as well as other news outlets.

Men's ice hockey

The Yale Men's Ice Hockey team is the oldest existing intercollegiate hockey program, having played its first game in 1896 against Johns Hopkins (a 2–2 tie). The team competes in the ECAC Hockey League (ECACHL); in addition the Ivy League also crowns a champion for its members that field varsity ice hockey. The Bulldogs (coached by Keith Allain) won the 2013 NCAA National Championship in Pittsburgh with a 4–0 shutout of Quinnipiac University.

Men's lacrosse

Men's soccer

Before the NCAA began its tournament in 1959, the annual national champion was declared by the Intercollegiate Association Football League (IAFL) — from 1911 to 1926 — and then the Intercollegiate Soccer Football Association (ISFA), from 1927 to 1958. From 1911 to 1958, Yale won four national championships.

Men's squash

Men's swimming and diving

Men's tennis
Irvin Dorfman played tennis for Yale (1947), and was later ranked No. 15 in singles in the United States in 1947, and No. 3 in doubles in the U.S. in 1948. In 1946 he won the Eastern Intercollegiate Tennis Title.

Richard Raskind, later known as Renée Richards, was captain of the 1954 men's team and later became a professional female tennis player.

Women's sports

Women's basketball

Women's crew

In 1976, the nineteen members of the Yale women's crew wrote "TITLE IX" on their bodies and went into athletic director Joni Barnett's office and took off their clothes, and then rower Chris Ernst read a statement about the way they were being treated. This protest was noted by newspapers around the world, including The New York Times. By 1977, a women's locker room was added to Yale's boathouse. (Previously,  there was no bathroom available for the women's crew team, so they had to wait on the bus after practice while the men showered before they could return to campus.) This protest was chronicled in the 1999 documentary A Hero For Daisy.

Women's ice hockey

Women's soccer

The Bulldogs women's soccer team won the NCAA College Cup in 2002, 2004 and 2005. In 2005, the team won a school record 15 games. That year it also won the first outright team Ivy League title in Yale history.

Former coach Rudy Meredith was indicted as part of the  2019 college admissions bribery scandal, for allegedly accepting bribes totaling hundreds of thousands of dollars to facilitate the admission of students to Yale as soccer players recruited to the Yale women's soccer team, despite their never having played competitive soccer. He pled guilty. Because he is cooperating with prosecutors, he may avoid the maximum penalties of 20 years in prison and $250,000 fines each of the charges carry, but he will have to forfeit the $850,000 in bribes he took in the scheme.

Women's swimming and diving

Notable non-varsity sports

Rugby

Yale rugby plays college rugby in Division 1 in the Ivy Rugby Conference. Yale Rugby was founded in 1875, making it one of the oldest rugby teams in North America. President George W. Bush played rugby for Yale during his student days.

See also
List of NCAA schools with the most Division I national championships
2019 college admissions bribery scandal

References

External links

 

 
Sports teams in the New York metropolitan area